Meja Road is an eastern part of the  Allahabad (now PRAYAGRAJ) district and very well connected with the city by road and Indian railways.  Meja Road has its railway station 1 km away from downtown in the north which is on the Allahabad – Mughal Sarai section of the Northern Railway in Uttar Pradesh, India, between Unchdih and Bhirpur stations.  It connects with Sirsa, Ramnagar, Unchdeeh(North), Allahabad City (West), Meja (South) and Mirzapur (East) by road.  It is  far from the Allahabad city and comes under Meja constituency.  Hindi, Urdu, and English are the languages that are spoken in Meja Road.  The dialect of Hindi spoken in Meja Road is Awadhi and all major religions are practiced here. Hindus comprise 86.81% and Muslims 12.72%.  There are small groups of Christians, Sikhs, and Buddhists with 0.18%, 0.13%, and 0.04% of the population, respectively. Education in Meja Road - B.N.T. Inter College and some more colleges are providing a good educational platform.

Ram Nagar (Shakti Peeth) is in North-side of Mejaroad.  It is 5 km from MejaRoad. Ram Nagar is famous for Mata Sheetala Mandir.
Many Hindu temples and pilgrimage are near to Mejaroad.

Mejaroad has Sidh Hanuman Ji Temple on Panti station road, Pravachan organized every year in the month of Karthik(October) by Temple Prashasan.
Late Pt Ram Kripal upadhyay freedom Fighter and Block pramukh Meja.

Climate
Meja Road features the typical version of a humid subtropical climate that is common across the north-central part of India. It experiences three seasons: hot dry summer, cool dry winter, and warm humid monsoon. Monsoon begins in early July and lasts till September. The winter season lasts from December to February. Temperatures rarely drop to the freezing point. It also witnesses severe fog in January resulting in massive traffic and travel delays. It does not snow in Meja Road. Lowest temperature recorded,  ; highest .

References 

Test123

Villages in Allahabad district